Cecilia Augusta Barraza Hora (Lima, Peru, 5 November 1952) is a popular Peruvian singer of música criolla.

Biography 
Barraza was born into an artistic family. Her older brothers were Carlos Barraza, a lawyer and poet, and Miguel "Chato" Barraza, a well-known Peruvian comedian.

Her career as a vocal artist began in April 1971, after she appeared on the television program "Trampoline to Fame," where she was awarded a prize for the best cover song. In this contest, she covered a song by Alicia Maguiña, "Everything is telling me about you." Chabuca Granda was dazzled by her sweet voice and proposed bringing Barraza to Mexico to tour with the pop group Perú Negro. Barraza accepted, and thus began her path to becoming an important figure in Peruvian music.

Discography
Cecilia Barraza (1971)
Cecilia Barraza Ahora
Cecilia Barraza Vol. II
Cecilia Barraza Vol. III (1977)
Yo, Cecilia Barraza (1981)
Alborotando (1997)
Canta y Encanta (2000)
Con Candela (2001)

References

External links 
 Landó No, no, no, de Andrés Soto interpretado por Cecilia Barraza
 Vals Cada Domingo a las Doce, de Augusto Polo Campos interpretado por Cecilia Barraza
 Marinera Cholita Norteña canta y baila Cecilia Barraza

1952 births
20th-century Peruvian women singers
20th-century Peruvian singers
People from Lima
Living people